National Guard Day is an official holiday that honors the National Guard of Russia on 27 March.

History
On 16 January 2017, by decree of President Vladimir Putin established 27 March as the Day of the National Guard. From 1996 to 2016, this day was celebrated as the Day of Internal Troops of Russia. The Day of Internal Troops was established by President Boris Yeltsin on 19 March 1996. The celebration of the Day of Internal Troops is historically associated with several decrees of Tsar Alexander I on the reorganization of the garrison units of the army and the creation of the Internal Guard. One of the final decrees, dated 27 March (8 April), 1811, marked the organization of the first of the internal guard.

Traditions
On this day, the command of the Russian Guard gives military personnel, employees with special police ranks and civilian personnel awards, gives thanks, assigns military and special ranks. Greetings are extended by the President of Russia.

Celebrations
Every year on 27 March in Moscow, the Commander-in-Chief of the National Guard lays a wreath at the monument to Alexander I. In Moscow, on Krasnokazarmennaya Street, generals and officers of the Rosgvardia lay flowers at the monument to the Internal Troops. The same ceremonial events take place in other cities, where military units guard are deployed. During a gala concert in the Grand Kremlin Palace in 2017, President Vladimir Putin handed the banner of the National Guard to the Director of the National Guard, Army General Viktor Zolotov.

See also
Public holidays in Russia
Defender of the Fatherland Day
Victory Day (9 May)
Russia Day

References

National Guard of Russia
Observances in Russia
Public holidays in Russia